There have been two baronetcies created for persons with the surname Crossley, both in the Baronetage of the United Kingdom.

The Crossley Baronetcy, of Belle Vue and Somerleyton, was created in the Baronetage of the United Kingdom on 23 January 1863. For more information on this creation, see the Baron Somerleyton.

The Crossley Baronetcy, of Glenfield in Dunham Massey in the County of Chester, was created in the Baronetage of the United Kingdom on 16 November 1909 for William Crossley. He was a Director of the Manchester Ship Canal, Chairman of Crossley Brothers (Ltd), of Manchester, and Liberal Member of Parliament for Altrincham from 1906 to 1911. The second Baronet served as High Sheriff of Cheshire in 1919. Anthony Crossley (1903–1939), only son of the second Baronet, represented Oldham and Stretford in the House of Commons before his early death in an aircrash.

As of 2013, the title is held by Sir Sloan Nicholas Crossley, 6th Baronet.

Crossley baronets, of Belle Vue and Somerleyton (1863)
see the Baron Somerleyton

Crossley baronets, of Glenfield (1909)

Sir William John Crossley, 1st Baronet (1844–1911)
Sir Kenneth Irwin Crossley, 2nd Baronet (1877–1957)
Sir Christopher John Crossley, 3rd Baronet (1931–1989)
Sir Nicholas John Crossley, 4th Baronet (1962–2000)
Sir Julian Charles Crossley, 5th Baronet (1964–2003)
Sir Sloan Nicholas Crossley, 6th Baronet (born 1958)

Notes

References
Kidd, Charles, Williamson, David (editors). Debrett's Peerage and Baronetage (1990 edition). New York: St Martin's Press, 1990, 

Crossley